Top Gear: Botswana Special is a full-length, special edition episode for BBC motoring programme Top Gear, and was first broadcast on BBC Two on 4 November 2007, as part of the seventh episode of Series 10. The special sees hosts, Jeremy Clarkson, Richard Hammond and James May, travelling across to Botswana with a car that each had bought in Africa for less than £1500, to prove that they can be better than SUVs for driving up "leafy country lanes". The Botswana Special was released as part of a 2-disc DVD boxset alongside the Top Gear: Vietnam Special on 23 March 2009.

Summary

First leg: Zimbabwean border to Makgadikgadi
To see if people in Surrey can get up "leafy lanes" with something other than a 4x4 SUV, the producers challenge Clarkson, Hammond and May to drive across Botswana in the used cars bought within Africa. Each given £1,500, the presenters are told that their choice of car had to be two-wheel drive and not have been designed in any way for off-road use—May decides to sensibly purchase a 1985 Mercedes-Benz 230E due to it being a car that Africa favoured and loved, Clarkson chose to buy a 1981 automatic Lancia Beta Coupé because of Lancia's history with rally racing, while Hammond oddly chose to go for a 1963 Opel Kadett. Setting off on their first leg, the trio revealed that each of their cars had some faults to them—Clarkson revealed that the dials and several components were broken, May had a minor number of parts that weren't working, while Hammond had brakes that only worked on one wheel and a smell of petrol in his car, but felt his was good and decided to name it "Oliver" (which he immediately regretted). As they moved off tarmac and onto dirt roads, Hammond's car broke down, whereupon the trio learned that if their car could not be restarted if it broke down, they would have to complete the rest of the journey in their least favourite car of all time—a Volkswagen Beetle. With Hammond's car fixed, they continued, and soon reached the camp site on the edge of the Makgadikgadi Pan.

Second leg: Makgadikgadi to Kalahari

Upon arriving before the Makgadikgadi, the trio soon learned that the following day they would be travelling across it for two days, and were thus advised to strip and lighten their cars as much as possible to avoid them breaking through the thin top crust of the salt pans. That night, May and Clarkson removed seats, interior trim and panels, along with the windows and other components, until their cars were reduced to being basic shells, while Hammond, who had grown attached to his car, was reluctant to do so, and instead chose to remove only the spare tyre it carried and an unspecified part. Prior to leaving, the trio received an informal visit by Ian Khama, the then-vice president of the country, who was impressed with the trio's plans to drive across the pans, but not so with their cars. Crossing the pans on the first of two days travel, the trio's progress was steady, until both Clarkson and May discovered that their cars were digging into the Pan's surface, forcing them to call for assistance from the film crew and support team in getting them out and cleaning out their wheels of "prehistoric gunk", before stripping their cars of further components including the doors and the boot lid. Despite further issues with the surface, it eventually became firmer, allowing them to reach one of the Pan's islands and their next campsite. On the second day, the trio learned that they would encounter a dust storm, which presented a major issue for May and Clarkson, as exposed to it, they were forced to re-dress themselves to avoid choking; much to their annoyance, Hammond had no need to take such measures. After overcoming the storms, despite suffering from it, Clarkson then found his car breaking down twice and having to repair the Lancia en route. Eventually all three managed to reach the other side and made camp on the edge of the Kalahari Desert.

Third leg: Kalahari to Maun
Arriving at a small village in the Kalahari, the trio were told that their cars would face a time trial each on a specially made rally course out of a dried riverbed nearby, with each car to be driven by "The Stig's African cousin". Prior to heading for the course, the Lancia broke down once again and had to be mended, before it joined the others. On the course, the Opel proved itself a good car and set a time of 1:12, while May's Mercedes did better and achieved a time of 1:06. However, Clarkson's car failed to start after overheating, with the Stig's cousin walking off as a result. Whilst waiting for it to cool down, Clarkson discovered a new problem—both the Lancia and Hammond's Opel ran on leaded fuel, and the reserve supply of it they were carrying had been used up. Because the cars of the film crew ran on diesel fuel, the only option left for the trio was to cut as straight a line as they could through the Kalahari towards the town of Maun. During their off-roading, May's Mercedes became stuck in sand, forcing him to get it out by placing stones to give the tyres some traction. By the time night had fallen, the trio found themselves on the road to Maun, whereupon the Opel's alternator stopped working and made it impossible to use the headlights, forcing Hammond to bring one of the film crew aboard and use a lamp to illuminate the road ahead of him. Despite the issues, all three cars arrived at a gas station in the town for refueling before they turned in for the night.

Fourth leg: Okavango Delta
The following morning, when the presenters were sitting outside a restaurant in the center of Maun, they were told that their cars would now proceed towards the Okavango Delta, which they would be crossing through for the next three days en route to the finish line at a border crossing with Namibia. To prepare for the journey, both Clarkson and May had to animal-proof their cars from various materials they could find, with a spare boot lid and rear door found for the Mercedes during the work before it was outfitted with corrugated metal doors, while Clarkson outfitted his Lancia with a wooden gull-wing door, a loudspeaker and handset system and sealed the other door with the drink cans used on the trip at that point. Whilst modifying the cars, Clarkson and Hammond also put a cow bell on the underside of May's car, planted a cow's head in the boot, and stuffed raw meat in various hiding places within the car; behind the scenes, the pair were told off by a local guide for endangering themselves, May and the film crew from an animal attack by attempting this practical joke, after the raw meat was found by them. With the cars modified, the trio began making for the Delta and immediately hit a sandy, dirt trail upon entering the Delta's game reserve, whereupon the Lancia suffered further problems when the throttle jammed open and would not brake properly as a result. Despite this, the trio ended their day by taking a moment to observe a number of animals at a watering hole, before camping for the night with James servicing his Mercedes and a bush mechanic clearing out sand from one of the Lancia's carburettors.

The next day, after Hammond had to fix the Opel's steering after the underside of the car hit a tough tree root on the road, the group found themselves encountering a river that they had to cross over. While Hammond opted to find a crossing point further along the banks, his colleague chose to wade across where they were; one idea the trio had for getting across, which was not shown in the TV broadcast, was to wrap the cars in some tarpaulin, inflated it with air, and then float them across the river, but this was abandoned after the group spent three and a half hours trying it. While Clarkson and May were successful in getting across despite nearly getting stuck and having their local guide shoot holes in the floors of their car to drain water that had gotten in, Hammond's attempt to ford the river at a proper crossing point, led to the Opel sinking into the water and stalling, requiring him to get it towed out. Due to the water damage it had received, Hammond was forced to spend the second night fixing his car's engine and electrics with the aid of the bush mechanics from the support team, while the others went ahead to make camp. In the morning, much to his colleagues' surprise, the Opel returned to working condition, with a further bonus being that the horn, which had been rubbish, had been fixed. Heading off for the final push towards the road to the border crossing, the trio managed to make it across the Delta, but by now, new problems emerged—Hammond's Opel wouldn't properly brake unless he de-clutched and used the handbrake, while the Lancia was now veering off to the right and could not be corrected.

Final leg: Okavango Delta to Namibian Border
After finally making it out of the Delta, Clarkson and May removed their animal protection from their cars, at which point the Lancia suffered another problem—the starter solenoid had packed in and thus had to be repaired for the car to start up again. Although it was able to move off, it was now unable to drive in anything other than second gear. Eventually, the car suffered another breakdown along the road, resulting in much of the support team and film crew choosing to leave it behind after being so fed up with the constant problems it had caused (some of the breakdowns were not aired in the broadcast), leaving Clarkson with only two bush mechanics staying behind to fix several issues that had developed, including the engine stalling after it started up every time by going into third gear. Miraculously, the Lancia was able to move off again, and reached the border with Namibia, behind Hammond and May. The Lancia was declared as the worst car due to it being a constant source of problems. Despite Hammond's Opel needing only minor repairs, and May's Mercedes having almost no problems at all, Clarkson declared the backup Beetle as the winner as it had no modifications or mishaps along the journey, much to Hammond's surprise.

In homage to Archbishop Desmond Tutu, Nobel Peace Prize winner in 1984, the end credits replaced each crew members first name with the words "Archbishop Desmond" (e.g. "Archbishop Desmond Clarkson, Archbishop Desmond Hammond, and Archbishop Desmond May...").

Production
Filming of the episode included extensive planning of the route that was to be taken across the Makgadikgadi Pan; several weeks were spent trying to ensure that the cars being used did not go anywhere near conservation areas, with the Top Gear crew working with environmental experts on the planning. Throughout the journey, the team were followed by a support team of bush mechanics who provided assistance with the repairs of their cars, and were assisted in the Okavango Delta by professional guide, Clinton Edwards, with further logistical and filming support supplied by Letaka Safaris and AfriScreen Films, the latter having done extensive work with the BBC's Natural History Unit on various nature films and segments.

Post filming
Following the end of filming, Hammond decided that, as he loved his car so much, his Opel would be returning home with him, and began procedures for having it restored and shipped back to Britain. It arrived in time to be shown in the studio during the series' final episode, appearing again during the HGV Challenge of Series 12, and then in Richard Hammond's CBBC show, Richard Hammond's Blast Lab.  The Beetle was donated to one of the bush mechanics in the support team, and the Mercedes to an adviser who had helped during filming. The Lancia, believed to have been scrapped following filming, was discovered to still be in Maun, as of 2020, partially reassembled though missing its wheels and headlights.

Criticism
The Environmental Investigation Agency criticised the BBC for allowing Top Gear to film in the Makgadikgadi pans following the broadcast of the special, claiming they had damaged the environmentally sensitive salt pans, adding that they had been shown "leaving scars across the Makgadikgadi salt pans by driving vehicles across them". In response to this, the BBC dismissed the claims by stating that the cars had not gone anywhere near to any conservation areas, and that they had followed the advice of environment experts, with the government of Botswana coming to the show's defence by stating that the Top Gear producers had spent considerable time ensuring that no damage was done to the wilderness by spending many weeks planning a suitable route.

DVD release
On 23 March 2009, the BBC released a two-disc box set entitled Top Gear - The Great Adventures 2, containing extended versions of both the Botswana Special and the Vietnam Special. The director's cut of this special included deleted scenes and commentary by the show's executive producer, Andy Wilman.

References

Botswana
Makgadikgadi Pan
2007 in Botswana
2007 in British television
2007 television specials